Alexander G. Grigoryants was an Armenian-Soviet rugby union player, who played for the national team. He was a Soviet Master of Sport.

He was active in the late 1960s and early 1970s, and his club was VVA-Podmoskovye Monino.

References
Sorokin, A.A. (А. А. Сорокин) "Rugby" (Регби) in English translation of Great Soviet Encyclopedia (Progress Publishers, Moscow, 1978)
Original Russian text available at   Большая советская энциклопедия: Регби

External links
 https://rugbystat.pythonanywhere.com/persons/2357/
 Rugby Federation of Armenia Veterans

Year of death missing
Armenian rugby union players
Russian rugby union players
Soviet rugby union players
Honoured Masters of Sport of the USSR
Soviet Armenians
1940 births